John Stephen Sudduth (born December 17, 1984), known professionally as Mikky Ekko, is an American recording artist and record producer from Nashville, signed to Interscope Records. He is best known for writing and being featured on Rihanna's 2013 single "Stay", which charted in multiple countries, becoming Ekko's first-charting material. Ekko released Time, his debut studio album, in January 2015 through RCA Records. Fame, his second album, was released in November 2018 on Interscope Records.

Early life
Born John Stephen Sudduth in Louisiana, Mikky Ekko had a restless childhood as the son of a preacher, moving around America's deep south.  Having settled briefly in Tupelo, Mississippi, and absorbed as much gospel as he could, he relocated to Nashville, Tennessee, and started playing in bands. Ekko began working as a songwriter for other artists, but realized that he wanted to be a singer himself. He released his first EP Strange Fruit (produced by Tim Lauer) on February 15, 2009, containing the first songs he'd written by himself, most of them a cappella. Ekko says of Nashville:  "fortunate to be in a city that's so loving and hospitable." From September 2009, he toured with the Nashville-based collective group Ten Out of Tenn.

Career

2008–12: Career beginnings
In 2009 he partnered with producer Tim Lauer and engineer Dan Hansen to record an a cappella version of "Sedated". That led to his first EP Strange Fruit which released February 15, 2009. Lauer and Hansen continued to collaborate with Ekko for 2010's Reds and Blues. They worked together to develop the character and sound of Mikky Ekko which led to growing attention in the music business.

"Who Are You, Really?", one of the tracks from Reds, caught the attention of experimental hip-hop producer Clams Casino, who had worked with ASAP Rocky, Lil B and The Weeknd. It was featured in no less than six TV series episodes (Teen Wolf, Ringer, Pretty Little Liars, True Blood, The Blacklist and Reign). The video for "Feels Like the End", his second official single, produced by Nick Ruth and Ekko, was released to YouTube on September 25, 2012, with the digital release following on September 25.  "Pull Me Down", written and produced by Ekko and Clams Casino, was released digitally on October 30, 2012. The official video was uploaded to YouTube on November 16, 2012. Ryan Hemsworth released a remix of the song to iTunes on December 7, 2012.

2012–16: Breakthrough and Time
In November 2012, Ekko was featured on singer Rihanna's seventh studio album Unapologetic on the track "Stay", which became a single in 2013. The song, originally written by Ekko and English songwriter Justin Parker, has charted in multiple countries, becoming Ekko's first-charting material. It gave Ekko his first entry on the UK Singles Chart, charting at number four, and on the US Billboard Hot 100 at three. The song charted in the top five of 19 countries, including in Australia, France, Germany, Ireland, New Zealand and Switzerland. It has sold an approximate 10 million copies globally, making it his best selling single. The singer performed "Stay" together with Rihanna for the first time at the 2013 Grammy Awards on February 10, 2013. Mikael Wood of Los Angeles Times positively reviewed the performance and wrote that it was the most memorable moment of the night. Ekko and Clams Casino, who have become friends, have been working on tracks (including "Pull Me Down") for Ekko's forthcoming debut album, which features collaborations with Ariel Rechtshaid, Greg Kurstin, Fraser T Smith, Elof Loelv, and Justin Parker. Ekko released his first official music video on February 6, 2013, for his third single "Pull Me Down" through his VEVO account. "Who Are You, Really?" was featured during the closing credits of HBO's season six premiere of "True Blood" on June 16, 2013. Ekko premièred the video for "Kids" through VEVO on July 8, 2013. It was released via iTunes on September 8, 2013. Ekko was reported to be one of the songwriters of the song "We Remain" for The Hunger Games: Catching Fire – Original Motion Picture Soundtrack, performed by Christina Aguilera.

Ekko's debut album was titled Time and the album's guest lineup ranged from hitmakers Benny Blanco, Ryan Tedder and Stargate to TV on the Radio's Dave Sitek, producer Dennis Herring and avant-hip-hop artist Clams Casino. In March 2015, the song "Smile" from the album Time was used in the trailer for the upcoming teen drama Paper Towns. Ekko's song "Watch Me Rise" became an opening theme for the EFL Championship on Sky Sports. In April 2015, he was picked as Elvis Duran's Artist of the Month and was featured on NBC's Today show hosted by Kathy Lee Gifford and Hoda Kotb and broadcast nationally where he performed live his single "Smile."

2016-2018: Fame 
Ekko began working on his next project, entitled Fame, in 2016. Produced by Jay Joyce, the album was recorded in Ekko's adopted hometown of Nashville. "Blood on the Surface," released October 13, 2017, was the first material released from Fame. Paper Magazine premiered the song on October 12, 2017, describing it as "synthy retro". "Light the Way", a second song, was released on October 20, 2017.

Fame was released on November 2, 2018.

Discography

Studio albums

Extended plays

Singles

As lead artist

References

External links
 
 Myspace

1984 births
Living people
American male singer-songwriters
RCA Records artists
Musicians from Nashville, Tennessee
Record producers from Louisiana
Record producers from Tennessee
Singer-songwriters from Louisiana
Singer-songwriters from Tennessee
Tupelo High School alumni
21st-century American singers
21st-century American male singers